Zahra Amir Ebrahimi (born July 9, 1981) known professionally as Zar Amir Ebrahimi, is an Iranian-French actress, producer and director. She is best known for her performance as journalist Arezoo Rahimi in the crime thriller Holy Spider (2022), for which she won the Best Actress award at the 2022 Cannes Film Festival.

Amir Ebrahimi is also a producer and host for the BBC and oversees a cultural program for the Persian branch of BBC World.
In 2022, she appeared on BBC's 100 Women list as one of the world's inspiring and influential women of the year.

Early life
Zahra Amir Ebrahimi was born on July 9, 1981 in Tehran, Iran. She studied theater in Azad University and started her professional career by making short films.

She speaks Persian, Pashto, English and French fluently, and knows basic Arabic, German and Italian.

Career

1999–2004: Career beginnings 
Amir Ebrahimi started her career by directing her first short film, Khat (2000), when she was only eighteen. In the same year, she starred in Reza Keshavarz's play Water, which was performed in the 19th Fajr Theatre Festival. 

In 2001, Amir Ebrahimi made her feature film debut alongside Mohammad Ali Keshavarz in Waiting, directed by Mohammad Nourizad. The same year, she acted in Ayat Najafi's play Sleepy Noon at the Niavaran Cultural Center of Téhéran.

In 2003, Amir Ebrahimi starred in two plays, Rahman Seifi Azad's Gathering in Hell and Reza Hadad's There Is No One Who Can Remember All the Stories. Both were performed at the 22nd Fajr Theatre Festival. There Is No One Who Can Remember All the Stories was also performed at the Lakoon Theatre Festival in Hamburg.

In 2004, she appeared in three television projects, Help Me, Like a Stranger and Vow. The first two, which are television series, were directed by Ghasem Jafari and the last one, which is a television film, was directed by Mehrdad Khoshbakht. All three projects were broadcast in different networks.

2006: Rising popularity through Nargess 
In 2006, Amir Ebrahimi starred in the hit television series Nargess directed by Sirous Moghaddam. The series was one of the most successful series of the year and during its airing, Amir Ebrahimi became very popular. The series later won the Hafez Award for Best Television Series. The same year, Amir Ebrahimi starred in the critically acclaimed drama film Trip to Hidalou, alongside Homayoun Ershadi and Mahmoud Pakniat, directed by Mojtaba Raie. The film premiered at the 34th Fajr Film Festival and won the Best Art & Experience Film award.

Months after the final episode of Nargess was broadcast, Amir Ebrahimi became the center of a national scandal when a homemade sex tape purportedly featuring her was leaked to the internet. Due to the scandal, she was banned from appearing in Iranian films and television for 10 years. Trip to Hidalou was also banned from screening due to the scandal and was never released.

2008–2019: Emigration and new projects 

After Amir Ebrahimi was in danger of being imprisoned, she fled Iran and moved to Paris, France in 2008. Months before her emigration, she had a small role in Palme d'Or-winning director Abbas Kiarostami's 2008 film Shirin, which premiered at the 65th Venice International Film Festival. 

In 2009, she started over her acting career in France with Mohamad Rezaierad's play Silent Taheregan's Dream, alongside Shabnam Tolouei.

In 2010, Amir Ebrahimi starred in Tinouche Nazmjou's play Voices of Women / Voices of Blood at Théâtre Pentu et Parole Avalancheuse, Théâtre de l'Épée de Bois and Festival de l'arpenteur in Grenoble.

In 2011, she appeared in the television documentary Great Persians, directed by Wesley Eremenko-Dodd and broadcast by BBC World Service.

In 2012, she starred in Ebrahim Makki's play The Land of Fear and Hope at Salle Ayad Paris. She also acted in Hamid Djavdan's play Little Red Boy (2014–2015) at La Compagnie des Mirages.

In 2015, Amir Ebrahimi acted in two short films, A Souvenir for My Mother and Jila directed by Iranian directors Mohammad Reza Kalani and Karim Lakzadeh, premiered at the 2015 Fribourg International Film Festival. She also did voice acting in Arte's Silex and the City from 2015 to 2017.

She got her first leading role by starring as Vida Irandoost in the Swedish drama film Bride Price vs. Democracy (2016) directed by Reza Rahimi. For her performance in the film, she won the award for Best Lead Actress in a Foreign Language Film at the 2018 Nice International Film Festival and received two other nominations.

In 2017, she played Sara in the German-Austrian film Tehran Taboo, directed by Ali Soozandeh, which used rotoscoping technique and premiered at the International Critics' Week section at the 2017 Cannes Film Festival.

In 2018, Amir Ebrahimi worked in four television projects. She did the voice acting of Siri Perse and Ishtar in Arte's animated television series 50 Shades of Greek from 2018 to 2020. She directed two television documentaries for BBC World Service and BBC Persian, titled Amir Naderi by Amir Naderi and Kahani's Cinema. Her last television project of 2018 was Arte's television documentary One Day in Tehran, directed by five Iranian directors.

In 2019, Amir Ebrahimi created her own production company, Alambic Production. She is also a producer and host for the BBC and oversees a cultural program for the Persian branch of BBC World.

In 2019, she appeared in two feature films, a short film and a television program. She acted as Farzaneh Rezvani in the French film Adopt a Daddy, directed by Xavier de Choudens, premiered at the 2019 L'Alpe d'Huez Film Festival; as Nadia in Hossein Pourseifi's film Tomorrow We Are Free premiered at the 2019 Filmfest Hamburg; as Alma in Manon Coubia's short film Tide, premiered at the 2019 Locarno Film Festival, and as herself in the three episodes of BBC World Service's 40 Years, 40 Films directed by Bibi Khajehnouri.

In March 2019, along with Golshifteh Farahani, she received the Hamburg Award for Cultural Freedom at the Persian Spring Festival in Germany, for the exemplary nature of her fight and her itinerary as an artist and independent Iranian woman.

Amir Ebrahimi is also a professional photographer, whose work focuses on social topics and issues.

 2022: Acclaim and worldwide recognition for Holy Spider 

In 2022, Amir Ebrahimi directed, produced and also hosted in BBC World Service's documentary Portrait of Women in Iranian Cinema.

Amir Ebrahimi also starred in Ali Abbasi's critically acclaimed thriller Holy Spider (2022), inspired by the true story of Saeed Hanaei, a serial killer who targeted sex workers and killed 16 women from 2000 to 2001 in Iran, in which she played journalist Arezoo Rahimi and won the Best Actress award at the 2022 Cannes Film Festival, becoming the first Iranian actress to win the award. Her performance garnered widespread critical acclaim. Variety critic, Clayton Davis, said "both lead actors (Amir Ebrahimi and Mehdi Bajestani) are worthy of Academy attention". She won the Best Actress award at the 2022 Seville European Film Festival, and 2023 Robert Awards. Amir Ebrahimi also earned a European Film Award for Best Actress nomination at the 35th European Film Awards and a Bodil Award for Best Actress in a Leading Role nomination for her performance. She also worked as a casting director and associate producer on the film, which was selected as Denmark's entry for Best International Feature Film at the 95th Academy Awards. 

Following her win at the Cannes Film Festival, the Cinema Organization of Iran's Ministry of Culture and Islamic Guidance issued a statement condemning the festival for awarding Amir Ebrahimi the Best Actress award, calling it "an insulting and politically-motivated move". Iran's Minister of Culture and Islamic Guidance Mohammad Mehdi Esmaili also threatened to punish Iranians who worked on Holy Spider. Amir Ebrahimi told CNN in June 2022 that she had received around 200 threats since winning the award at Cannes.

The same year, she had a leading role alongside SAG Award-winning actor Denis Ménochet in the French thriller film White Paradise, directed by Guillaume Renusson. The film premiered at the 2022 Angoulême Film Festival in August 2022.

In December 2022, Amir Ebrahimi appeared on BBC's 100 Women list as one of the world's inspiring and influential women of the year.

 2023: Shayda and upcoming projects 
Amir Ebrahimi played the titular character in Noora Niasari's directional debut, Shayda, executive produced by Cate Blanchett. The film had its world premiere at the 2023 Sundance Film Festival and won the Audience Award for World Cinema Dramatic Competition.

It was announced that Amir Ebrahimi will be starring in the short film Please Rise directed by Sheida Sheikhha.

From 27 January to 5 February 2023, Amir Ebrahimi served as head of the jury of the Nordic competition at Sweden's Gothenburg Film Festival. She also led a manifestation in support of actress Taraneh Alidoosti and the people of Iran who have been threatened by the government, arrested or sentenced to prison as they protested against the oppressive Iranian regime.

At Gothenburg Film Festival, Amir Ebrahimi announced her upcoming directorial debut in an interview with Variety. The film will be a biopic feature film about her last year in Iran, with the working title Honor of Persia. 

She also starred and co-directed a political thriller film, Untitled Judo with Academy Award-winning director Guy Nattiv which is the first directorial  collaboration between an Iranian and an Israeli filmmaker.

Amir Ebrahimi starred in Mehran Tamadon's My Worst Enemy documentary as herself and Steffi Niederzoll's Seven Winters in Tehran documentary as Reyhaneh Jabbari's voice, which both had their world premiere at the 73rd Berlin International Film Festival's Encounters section and Perspektive Deutsches Kino section. Seven Winters in Tehran won Compass Perspektive Award and Peace Film Prize at the film festival.

She also worked as casting director on Opponent (2023), directed by Milad Alami, starring Payman Maadi, which also premiered at the 73rd Berlin International Film Festival.

She was chosen as one of the guest jury members of 2023 ANDAM fashion awards, alongside Gigi Hadid and Pat Cleveland.

 Other activities 
 Politics and activism 
Amir Ebrahimi has publicly supported the protest led by Iranian women following the death of Mahsa Amini and often shares on her social media the news about the protests and how people can help Iranian people.

Personal life
 Sex tape scandal 

In 2006, Amir Ebrahimi became the center of an Iranian sex tape scandal when a videotape of a woman, claimed to be Amir Ebrahimi, having sex with a man was leaked to the internet and released on DVD. She subsequently became the subject of an official investigation handled by Tehran's chief prosecutor, Saeed Mortazavi. In an interview with The Guardian'', Amir Ebrahimi denied being the woman in the film and dismissed it as a forgery made by a vengeful former fiancé who used studio techniques to form a montage of incriminating images designed to destroy her career. However, she later admitted that the tape depicted her and a boyfriend and had been stolen from their apartment. The unnamed man on the tape reportedly fled to Armenia but was subsequently returned to Iran and charged with breach of public morality laws. Rumours of an attempted suicide were also denied by Amir Ebrahimi with a public message: "I just want to tell my country's people that I am alive. I am thinking about the strength of Iranian women and will defend the respect of the girls and women of my nation."

Due to the sex tape scandal, Amir Ebrahimi was banned from appearing in Iranian films and television for 10 years, and was also sentenced to prison and ninety-nine lashes, which made her flee Iran and move to Paris, France, where she has lived in exile since 2008. The man who leaked the tape—a friend of Amir Ebrahimi's and fellow actor who did not feature in it—was sentenced to six years in prison, but was released after two months.

In France, she was able to rely upon the support of other Iranian exiles, such as her close friend Golshifteh Farahani. Amir Ebrahimi became a French citizen in 2017.

Filmography

Film

Television

Theatre

Awards and nominations

Notes

References

External links

 
 Zar Amir Ebrahimi on UniFrance
 Zar Amir Ebrahimi on Cineuropa

1981 births
Living people
People from Tehran
People from Paris
Iranian television actresses
Iranian actresses
Iranian film actresses
French film actresses
French television actresses
French women film producers
Iranian women film producers
French women film directors
Iranian women film directors
Iranian stage actresses
French stage actresses
Actresses from Tehran
Iranian women photographers
French women photographers
BBC 100 Women
21st-century women photographers
Cannes Film Festival Award for Best Actress winners
Iranian emigrants to France
Naturalized citizens of France
20th-century Iranian actresses
21st-century Iranian actresses
20th-century French actresses
21st-century French actresses